Liu Zhixuan, born January 7, 1991) is a Chinese professional basketball player for the Jiangsu Dragons of the Chinese Basketball Association (CBA). He represented China's national basketball team at the 2016 FIBA Asia Challenge in Tehran, Iran, where he recorded most assists for his team and was also the best 3 point and free throw shooter.

References

External links
FIBA Profile
Asia-basket.com Profile

1991 births
Living people
Basketball players from Liaoning
Liaoning Flying Leopards players
Shooting guards
Small forwards
Chinese men's basketball players
Basketball players at the 2018 Asian Games
Asian Games gold medalists for China
Medalists at the 2018 Asian Games
Asian Games medalists in basketball